The 2009–10 CCHL season was the first and only season of the Central Canadian Hockey League (CCHL). The 21 teams of the East and West Divisions competed in 50 regular season games, with the top eight teams in each division competing in the playoffs for the league championship.

The CCHL's playoff champion played against the Ontario Junior A Hockey League's champion for the Buckland Cup.  The champion of that series played for the Dudley Hewitt Cup against the Northern Ontario Junior Hockey League and Superior International Junior Hockey League champions for the right to attend the 2010 Royal Bank Cup.

The league re-merged with the Ontario Junior A Hockey League after the 2009–10 season, and re-formed the Ontario Junior Hockey League.

Changes 
 OJHL is dissolved. Central Division becomes its own league.
 Central Division Hockey is renamed Central Canadian Hockey League.
 Toronto Dixie Beehives have relocated to Etobicoke, Ontario and changed name to Dixie Beehives.
 Upper Canada Hockey Club has relocated to Etobicoke, Ontario and changed name to Upper Canada Patriots.

Standings 
Note: GP = Games played; W = Wins; L = Losses; OTL = Overtime losses; SL = Shootout losses; GF = Goals for; GA = Goals against; PTS = Points; x = clinched playoff berth; y = clinched division title; z = clinched conference title

Top eight from each division make the playoffs (blue tinted), (x-) denotes playoff berth, (y-) denotes elimination.

Teams listed on the official league website.

Standings listed by Pointstreak on official league website.

Playoffs

Buckland Cup
The Buckland Cup is the Junior "A" Championship of the Ontario Hockey Association.  The winner of the Buckland Cup moves on to the 2010 Dudley Hewitt Cup.

Oakville Blades (OJAHL) defeated Newmarket Hurricanes 4-games-to-2
Game 1: 04/03/2010 - Newmarket 3 @ Oakville 4
Game 2: 04/05/2010 - Oakville 1 @ Newmarket 4
Game 3: 04/07/2010 - Newmarket 3 @ Oakville 1
Game 4: 04/08/2010 - Oakville 3 @ Newmarket 2
Game 5: 04/10/2010 - Newmarket 3 @ Oakville 4 OT
Game 6: 04/12/2010 - Oakville 6 @ Newmarket 1

Scoring leaders 
Note: GP = Games played; G = Goals; A = Assists; Pts = Points; PIM = Penalty minutes

Leading goaltenders 
Note: GP = Games played; Mins = Minutes played; W = Wins; L = Losses: OTL = Overtime losses; SL = Shootout losses; GA = Goals Allowed; SO = Shutouts; GAA = Goals against average

Award winners
Overall
 Top Scorer - Josh Jooris (Burlington Cougars)

Eastern Conference
 Best Defenceman - Jeff Least (Markham Waxers)
 Most Gentlemanly Player - Jeremy Franklin (Wellington Dukes)
 Most Improved Player - Jordan Reed (Ajax Attack)
 Most Valuable Player - Kori Coelho (Stouffville Spirit)
 Rookie of the Year - Jackson Teichroeb (Bowmanville Eagles)
 Coach of the Year - Curtis Hodgins (Bowmanville Eagles)
 Best Goaltender - Jodan Ruby (Wellington Dukes)

Western Conference
 Best Defenceman - Justin Baker (Streetsville Derbys)
 Most Gentlemanly Player - Jacob Mooney (North York Rangers)
 Most Improved Player - Phil Brewer (Burlington Cougars)
 Most Valuable Player - Greg Carey (Burlington Cougars)
 Rookie of the Year - Lucas Lessio (St. Michael's Buzzers)
 Coach of the Year - Mark Jooris (Burlington Cougars)
 Best Goaltender - Jimmy Sarjeant (Newmarket Hurricanes)

Players selected in 2010 NHL Entry Draft
 Rd 3 #77   Alexander Guptill -   Dallas Stars         (Orangeville Crushers)
 Rd 3 #87   Julian Melchiori -    Atlanta Thrashers    (Newmarket Hurricanes)
 Rd 5 #123   Zach Hyman -         Florida Panthers     (Hamilton Red Wings)

See also 
 2010 Royal Bank Cup
 Dudley Hewitt Cup
 List of Ontario Hockey Association Junior A seasons
 Ontario Junior A Hockey League
 Northern Ontario Junior Hockey League
 Superior International Junior Hockey League
 Greater Ontario Junior Hockey League
 2009 in ice hockey
 2010 in ice hockey

References

External links 
 Official website of the Central Canadian Hockey League
 Official website of the Canadian Junior Hockey League

2009-10
CCHL